São Pedro de Sarracenos is a civil parish in the municipality of Bragança, Portugal. The population in 2011 was 366, in an area of 15.91 km².

References

Parishes of Bragança, Portugal